The 2016 Renault UK Clio Cup is a multi-event, one make motor racing championship held across England. The championship features a mix of professional motor racing teams and privately funded drivers competing in the Clio Renaultsport 200 Turbo EDC that conform to the technical regulations for the championship. It forms part of the extensive program of support categories built up around the BTCC. It will be the 21st Renault Clio Cup United Kingdom season and the 41st of UK motorsport undertaken by Renault and Renault Sport. The first race takes place on 2 April at Brands Hatch on the circuit's Indy configuration and concluded on 2 October at the same venue, utilising the Grand Prix circuit, after eighteen races held at nine meetings.

Teams and drivers

Race calendar and results
The provisional calendar was announced by the championship organisers on 28 October 2015. Snetterton Motor Racing Circuit returns to the calendar in 2016, replacing the round held at Knockhill Racing Circuit.

Championship standings

Drivers' championship

Notes
A driver's best 16 scores counted towards the championship, with any other points being discarded.

Teams' championship

References

External links

Renault Clio Cup UK seasons
Renault UK Clio Cup